Knute Carl Buehler (born August 1, 1964) is an American physician and politician who served as the Oregon State Representative for the 54th district from 2015 until January 2019. He was the  Republican nominee for Governor of Oregon in the 2018 election, losing to incumbent Democrat Kate Brown. In 2021, he stated that he had left the Republican Party, citing the state party's response to the 2021 storming of the United States Capitol as his primary motivation. Buehler is no longer registered with any political party.

Early life
Buehler is originally from Roseburg, Oregon, and was born in 1964. He attended Oregon State University (OSU) where he played on the varsity baseball team. He graduated from OSU in 1986 with degrees in history and microbiology. Buehler attended Merton College, Oxford as OSU's first Rhodes Scholar, studying philosophy, politics and economics, before graduating from the Johns Hopkins School of Medicine in Baltimore, Maryland.

An orthopedic surgeon, he lives in Bend in Central Oregon with his wife and two children. He worked on political independent Ross Perot's presidential campaign in 1992 and was one of the primary authors of a campaign finance ballot measure which passed by a wide margin in 1994. The limits were knocked-down by the Oregon Supreme Court in 1997 as a violation of the state's wide-ranging freedom of speech protections.

Political career

2012 Oregon Secretary of State campaign 
Buehler was the unsuccessful Republican Party nominee for Oregon Secretary of State in 2012, losing to incumbent Secretary of State Democrat Kate Brown with five candidates on the ballot.

State Representative
Buehler won election to the Oregon House of Representatives in 2014, defeating Democrat Craig Wilhelm. In his first session as a lawmaker he was the primary author of a new law which allows women in Oregon to buy oral contraception over the counter without a doctors prescription. Buehler was re-elected in 2016, narrowly defeating Democrat Gena Goodman-Campbell.

Buehler describes himself as a moderate and his pro-choice stances on abortion have been a source of political tension "from left and right." In July 2016, Buehler received a 65% rating from the American Conservative Union, although by November of that year it had dropped to 58%. In November 2017, Knute Buehler was the first Republican to call for the resignation of fellow Republican State Senator Jeff Kruse following multiple allegations of sexual harassment.

Ethics complaints 
The Democratic Party of Oregon Chair filed three ethics complaints against Buehler in the spring of 2017 regarding his campaign finance disclosures for the last four years. Two claims were dismissed by a state ethics committee. Buehler avoided civil penalties in the third complaint by acknowledging his violation of an Oregon statute which requires listing of all income received over $1,000 from any source as part of a state-mandated Letter of Education, along with restating his finance declarations retroactively to 2013. Buehler said the censure was "politically motivated," the original filers claimed that "he continues to hide income."

Gubernatorial campaign

Almost immediately after his re-election, Buehler was considered a front-runner for the Republican nomination to run for governor in 2018. Republicans claimed Democrats were already working to undercut Buehler through legislative committee assignments. On August 3, 2017, Buehler announced he would run for Governor of Oregon in the 2018 election. On May 15, 2018, Buehler won the Republican nomination for Governor of Oregon to face off against Democratic incumbent Kate Brown in November 2018, in a rematch of the 2012 Secretary of State election. Buehler lost the general election to Kate Brown by 6.4%  Both Brown and Buehler raised and spent record amounts in their campaigns.

Political positions 
Buehler is considered a fiscally conservative moderate Republican. He is pro-choice on the issue of abortion. On immigration, he opposes sanctuary cities and opposes Oregon's statewide sanctuary policy. He supports gay rights, including same-sex marriage, and voted to ban conversion therapy from being used on minors. Buehler said during the gubernatorial campaign that he supported Oregon's capital punishment law which was passed by Oregon voters in 1984.  In the wake of the contentious events of 6 January 2021 in Washington D.C., and especially a controversial statement by the Oregon Republican Party issued by its chairman Bill Currier two weeks afterwards, Buehler announced his departure from the Republican party to become a non-affiliated voter. The New York Times wrote "The night after his party's leadership passed a formal resolution promoting the false flag theory, Mr. Buehler claimed to have cracked open a local microbrew and filed to change his registration from Republican to independent. 'It was very painful', he said. Knute is no longer registered with any political party.

Electoral history

See also
List of party switchers in the United States

References

External links

Knute Buehler Oral History Interview

1964 births
21st-century American physicians
21st-century American politicians
Alumni of Merton College, Oxford
American orthopedic surgeons
American Rhodes Scholars
Candidates in the 2018 United States elections
Johns Hopkins School of Medicine alumni
Living people
Members of the Oregon House of Representatives
Oregon Independents
Oregon Republicans
Oregon State Beavers baseball players
Physicians from Oregon
Politicians from Bend, Oregon
Politicians from Roseburg, Oregon